Adhémar Raynault (12 July 1891 – 11 April 1984) was a Canadian politician and a Mayor of Montreal.

Early life 
Adhémar Raynault was born on July 12, 1891 in Saint-Gérard-de-Magella. Raynault moved to Montreal in 1911. He started as a clerk in a trading house. He has several jobs before becoming an insurance broker. During this period, he continued to perfect his training in the evening, after work. Pretty quickly, he becomes an important personality in the business world.

City politics
He was a City councillor for the district of Préfontaine in Montreal from 1934 to 1936.  He also served as Mayor from 1936 to 1938, and from 1940 to 1944.  His last tenure as mayor was provisionally served while Camillien Houde was interned for wartime opposition to conscription.

Member of the provincial Legislature
Raynault was elected to the Legislative Assembly of Quebec in the district of L'Assomption in the 1936 general election and sat with the Union Nationale. He did not run again in the 1939 general election.

Personal life 
He is the great uncle of former MP Francine Raynault.

References

External links

 

1891 births
1984 deaths
Mayors of Montreal
Union Nationale (Quebec) MNAs
Burials at Notre Dame des Neiges Cemetery